Los Altos Hills (Los Altos, Spanish for "The Heights") is an incorporated town in Santa Clara County, California, United States. The population was 8,489 at the 2020 census. The town is known for its affluence and expensive residential real estate.

Geography 
Los Altos Hills is located at  (37.371390, -122.137605).

The town is located in a group of small hills. Both the Altamont and Monta Vista Faults pass through the town.

Los Altos Hills maintains a rural feel, similar to the likes of neighboring Woodside and Portola Valley (see: Strictly Residential). There are many open space preserves, such as Rancho San Antonio and Westwind Barn.

The Los Altos Hills ZIP code 94022 appeared on the 2017 Forbes list of America's most expensive ZIP codes; 94022 was ranked the 3rd most expensive in the United States, with a median home price of $7,755,000. In 2019, a Bloomberg analysis ranked Los Altos Hills the fourth richest town in the United States.

Strictly residential
Los Altos Hills has a ban on commercial zones, which was upheld by the California Court of Appeal (First District) in 1973. The town's two retail commercial operations are the book store on the campus of Foothill College and the gift shop on the grounds of the Immaculate Heart Monastery of the Poor Clare Colettines. The town does not have a post office or library, with mail delivery provided from nearby Los Altos.

The town's zoning regulations require a minimum lot size of one acre (4,000 m²), setbacks from the property boundary, and easements for public pathways. Landowners are limited to one primary dwelling per lot, which effectively bans multifamily housing; this ban and the minimum lot size were upheld as constitutional by the U.S. Court of Appeals for the Ninth Circuit in 1974.

The town contracts with Santa Clara County for police and fire services, making it a so-called "contract city" under California law.

The town is home to a monastery of the Immaculate Heart of the Poor Clare Colettines.

Demographics

2010
At the 2010 census Los Altos Hills had a population of 7,922. The racial makeup of Los Altos Hills was 5,417 (68.4%) White, 37 (0.5%) African American, 4 (0.1%) Native American, 2,109 (26.6%) Asian, 8 (0.1%) Pacific Islander, 50 (0.6%) from other races, and 297 (3.7%) from two or more races. Hispanic or Latino of any race were 213 people (2.7%).

The census reported that 99.3% of the population lived in households and 0.7% lived in non-institutionalized group quarters.

There were 2,829 households, 949 (33.5%) had children under the age of 18 living in them, 2,204 (77.9%) were opposite-sex married couples living together, 114 (4.0%) had a female householder with no husband present, 53 (1.9%) had a male householder with no wife present.  There were 53 (1.9%) unmarried opposite-sex partnerships, and 19 (0.7%) same-sex married couples or partnerships. 359 households (12.7%) were one person and 210 (7.4%) had someone living alone who was 65 or older. The average household size was 2.78.  There were 2,371 families (83.8% of households); the average family size was 3.02.

The age distribution was 1,811 people (22.9%) under the age of 18, 342 people (4.3%) aged 18 to 24, 1,083 people (13.7%) aged 25 to 44, 2,848 people (36.0%) aged 45 to 64, and 1,838 people (23.2%) who were 65 or older.  The median age was 50.2 years. For every 100 females, there were 97.8 males.  For every 100 females age 18 and over, there were 96.4 males.

There were 3,001 housing units at an average density of 341.0 per square mile, of the occupied units 2,582 (91.3%) were owner-occupied and 247 (8.7%) were rented. The homeowner vacancy rate was 1.2%; the rental vacancy rate was 4.2%.  7,162 people (90.4% of the population) lived in owner-occupied housing units and 707 people (8.9%) lived in rental housing units.

The median household income was $219,485 and the median family income  was $224,922. Males had a median income of $152,361 versus $89,216 for females. The per capita income for the town was $118,779. About 2.2% of families and 2.6% of the population were below the poverty line, including 0.7% of those under age 18 and 3.8% of those age 65 or over.

2000
At the 2000 census there were 7,902 people, 2,740 households, and 2,339 families in the town. The racial makeup of the town was 74.94% White, 21.10% Asian, 0.59% African American, 0.09% Native American, 0.09% Pacific Islander, 0.46% from other races, and 2.73% from two or more races. Hispanic or Latino of any race were 2.15%.

Of the 2,740 households 34.6% had children under the age of 18 living with them, 79.0% were married couples living together, 4.4% had a female householder with no husband present, and 14.6% were non-families. 10.5% of households were one person and 4.9% were one person aged 65 or older.  The average household size was 2.86 and the average family size was 3.02.

The age distribution was 23.6% under the age of 18, 4.0% from 18 to 24, 19.6% from 25 to 44, 35.8% from 45 to 64, and 17.0% 65 or older.  The median age was 47 years. For every 100 females, there were 97.4 males.  For every 100 females age 18 and over, there were 94.2 males.

The median household income was $143,570 and the median family income  was $161,865. Males had a median income of $200,000+ versus $178,288 for females. The per capita income for the town was $92,840.  About 1.2% of families and 1.9% of the population were below the poverty line, including 2.5% of those under age 18 and 2.0% of those age 65 or over.

Politics and government

The town of Los Altos Hills has a five-member elected city council. Several volunteer committees report to the city council, covering issues such as Open Space, Pathways, Environmental Initiatives, Education, Historical, Parks and Recreation, Community Relations Committee, Emergency Communications Committee, Environmental Design and Protection, Finance and Investment, Westwind Community Barn.

Los Altos Hills also has a twenty-member Youth Commission.

Of 5,870 registered voters, 37% are Democrats, while 29% are Republicans according to the California Secretary of State.

Education
Los Altos Hills is served by both the Palo Alto Unified School District (serving the northern part of the town) and the Los Altos School District (serving the southern part of the town). In 2008 the Los Altos School District reopened Gardner Bullis School, a public elementary (K-6) grade school in Los Altos Hills.

Ventana School is a private pre-school and elementary school modeled around the Reggio Emilia approach. Pinewood is a private coeducational K-12 school. The Pinewood School Upper Campus is also located in Los Altos Hills, serving students in grades 7-12.

Foothill College operated by the Foothill–De Anza Community College District is in the city. The college has the district's headquarters.

Notable residents

Adrienne Barbeau, actress, singer and author
Barry Bonds, baseball player
Sergey Brin, co-founder of Google
John T. Chambers, former executive chairman and CEO of Cisco Systems
Jon M. Chu and his father "Chef Chu" Lawrence Chu
Steve Kirsch, entrepreneur
George M. Marcus, billionaire real estate broker and founder of Marcus & Millichap
Yuri Milner, entrepreneur, venture capitalist, and physicist
Gordon Moore, billionaire businessman
Becky Morgan, former politician
David Packard (1912 – 1996), co-founder of Hewlett-Packard
Sundar Pichai, CEO of Alphabet Inc. and Google
Frank Quattrone, investment banker
Stephen Schott, real estate developer
Wallace Stegner (1909 – 1993), historian and novelist
Max Thieriot, actor and director
Jerry Yang, co-founder and former CEO of Yahoo! Inc.
Jed York, CEO of the San Francisco 49ers
Connie Young Yu, writer, historian, and lecturer

References

External links

 
Los Altos Town Crier – city newspaper

Cities in Santa Clara County, California
Cities in the San Francisco Bay Area
Los Altos, California
Silicon Valley
Populated places established in 1956
1956 establishments in California
Incorporated cities and towns in California